The Ultimate Collection is a compact disc by The Temptations, released on Motown Records, catalogue 314530562-2, in March 1997. It is a collection of singles comprising many of the group's greatest hits, with liner notes written by producer Harry Weinger.

Content
The disc was part of an "Ultimate Collection" series initiated in 1997 by Motown for many of their top-selling classic artists, but unlike many of its companions it doesn't limit itself to the "classic era" when Motown was located in Detroit, but includes songs from later eras up to the 1990s. The Temptations went through personnel changes themselves, the first twelve tracks on the disc comprising songs from their "classic line-up" of David Ruffin, Paul Williams, Eddie Kendricks, Otis Williams, and Melvin Franklin. The disc contains sixteen top ten Rhythm and Blues singles chart hits, and seventeen Top 40 hits on the Billboard Hot 100 enjoyed by the Temptations and released on the Motown associate label Gordy Records imprint. One track is a b-side, "Don't Look Back" which registered on both the Pop and R&B singles charts independently of its A-side "My Baby," not included on this set. "Angel Doll," an outtake recorded in the winter of 1967 during sessions for the Temptations with A Lot O' Soul album, and the a cappella excerpt of "My Girl" that closes the disc, were both released in 1994 on the Emperors of Soul box set. Included as well is a track recorded for the box set and issued a week after its release as a single, "Error of Our Ways," co-written by long-standing members Melvin Franklin and Otis Williams, and making the lower reaches of the R&B chart three decades after "The Way You Do the Things You Do."

Starting in the late 1960s and early 1970s, standard industry practice shifted to a focus on album sales, where a single became less a separate entity and more simply an advertisement for an LP, and a lead single would be pulled off an album as a promotional tool. Prior to this, singles were concentrated upon as a profitable commodity, especially for smaller record labels, and albums were often built around already successful singles. Since Motown fixated on the hit single until the very end of its stay in Detroit, single versions of songs often featured different mixes than versions that would be later placed on albums. Singles were usually mixed "punchier" and "hotter" to sound better on car radios receiving AM broadcast. The single versions are the ones appearing here.

Personnel
 Otis Williams — vocals
 Melvin Franklin — vocals
 David Ruffin — vocals tracks 1-12, 21
 Eddie Kendricks — vocals tracks 1-16, 21
 Paul Williams — vocals tracks 1-16, 21
 Dennis Edwards — vocals tracks 13-18
 Richard Street — vocals tracks 17-19
 Damon Harris — vocals tracks 17-18
 Ali-Ollie Woodson — vocals tracks 19-20
 Ron Tyson — vocals tracks 19-20
 Theo Peoples — vocals track 20
 The Andantes — vocals track 3
 The Funk Brothers — instruments tracks 1-17
 Members of the Detroit Symphony Orchestra conducted by Gordon Staples — strings

Track listing
Singles chart peak positions from Billboard charts; no R&B chart existed from November 30, 1963, through January 23, 1965.

References

1997 compilation albums
The Temptations compilation albums
Motown compilation albums